Sabato's Crystal Ball is an online political newsletter and election handicapper. It predicts electoral outcomes for the United States House of Representatives, United States Senate, U.S. governors, and U.S. presidential races, with electoral and political analysis. A publication of the University of Virginia Center for Politics, the Crystal Ball was founded by political analyst Larry Sabato, the Robert Kent Gooch Professor of Politics at the University of Virginia.

History

2002
The Crystal Ball was first launched in September 2002, evolving from pre-election presentations given by founder Larry J. Sabato.  For the 2002 midterm elections, the Crystal Ball tracked every U.S. Senate and gubernatorial race and the top 50 U.S. House of Representatives races. In 2002, the website received 160,000 hits, averaging over 5,000 hits per day over the last three weeks of the campaign, with over 1,500 people subscribing to its weekly e-mail updates.

2004
Following a post-election hiatus, the Crystal Ball re-launched on January 27, 2003, to cover the 2004 election cycle.  In addition to continuing its e-mail newsletter and website analysis, the Crystal Ball sent correspondents to both the Democratic National Convention in Boston and the Republican National Convention in New York City. On Election Day, the Crystal Ball correctly predicted 434 of the 435 U.S. House races (99.7%), 33 of 34 U.S. Senate races (97%), 10 of 11 governor's races (91%), and 48 of 50 states in the presidential Electoral College (96%).

2006
The Pew Research Center's Project for Excellence in Journalism found that the Crystal Ball "probably came closer than any other of the 10 top political predictors" on the 2006 election cycle.  During the 2006 election cycle the Crystal Ball added House Race Editor Dave Wasserman and expanded its election coverage and analysis. The Crystal Ball correctly predicted a 29-seat pick-up for Democrats in the House and 6 seat pick-up in the Senate.

2008
In August 2007, the Crystal Ball added political analyst and author Rhodes Cook to its team, a veteran of Congressional Quarterly and editor of the America Votes series. Also in 2007, House Race Editor Dave Wasserman left to assume that same position at the Cook Political Report and was replaced by Isaac Wood.

In July 2008, when many analysts were predicting a tight race for President, the Crystal Ball published an essay which correctly projected that Barack Obama would win in a near-landslide.

In the elections of November 2008, the Crystal Ball correctly predicted 421 of 435 U.S. House races (97%), 34 of 35 U.S. Senate races (97%), and 11 of 11 gubernatorial races (100%).  In the presidential election, the Crystal Ball predicted an Electoral College victory of 364 to 174 for Democrat Barack Obama, a total which was just one vote off of the final tally. They correctly predicted 48 out of 50 states, their only errors being in Missouri, where they thought Obama would win, and in Indiana, where they thought McCain would win (the opposite happened in these 2 states), and they also inaccurately predicted McCain would win NE-2.

2010
In November 2010, Crystal Ball projected that Republicans would pick up 55 seats in the House of Representatives.  The Republicans picked up 63 House seats.  It predicted a pickup of 8 seats in the Senate for Republicans.  The Republicans picked up 6 Senate seats.

2012
In 2012, Crystal Ball projected that Obama would win the presidency 290 electoral votes to 248 for Mitt Romney; there would be no change in composition of the Senate with Democrats at 53 and Republicans at 47; and Democrats would pick up 3 seats in the House of Representatives making it 239 Republicans and 196 Democrats.
Actually, incumbent Democratic President Barack Obama won 332 electoral votes, to Republican challenger Mitt Romney's 206. In the Senate, the Democrats gained a net of two seats, leaving them with a total of 53 seats. The Republicans lost a net of two seats, ending with a total of 45 seats. The remaining two senators, both independents, caucused with the Democrats, leaving the majority party with a combined total of 55 seats. House Republicans retained a 234 to 201 seat majority.

2014
In 2014, the Crystal Ball predicted that Republicans would win control of the U.S. Senate and hold the House, while also retaining the majority of state governorships. However, they underestimated the magnitude of Republican victories, incorrectly calling the result in the North Carolina Senate race, where Republican Thom Tillis defeated Democratic incumbent Kay Hagan, and predicting that Republicans would pick up nine net House seats, when they actually gained thirteen. Additionally, they predicted that the Democrats would defeat incumbent Republican Governors in Florida, Kansas and Maine, while retaining their seats in Illinois and Maryland. Republicans ended up winning all five races, although the Crystal Ball correctly predicted the Republican gains of open Democratic-held governorships in Arkansas and Massachusetts, and the defeats of Republican incumbents Tom Corbett in Pennsylvania and Sean Parnell in Alaska.

2016
In the 2016 election, Crystal Ball projected that Democrat Hillary Clinton would win the presidency 322 electoral votes to 216 for Republican Donald Trump. They predicted a 50-50 senate, and for Democrats to pick up 13 seats in the House of Representatives, making it 201 Democrats and 234 Republicans.

It would turn out to be the most inaccurate prediction in the history of the Crystal Ball, with Sabato saying "Well, what can we say — we blew it."

The Crystal Ball incorrectly predicted Hillary Clinton to win Florida, North Carolina, Pennsylvania and Michigan, all states that they had predicted as leaning for Hillary Clinton, as well as Wisconsin, a state they had rated as even safer for Clinton, all predicting she would get 90 more electoral votes than she actually had pledged to her. They incorrectly predicted that Republican Senators Ron Johnson of Wisconsin and Pat Toomey of Pennsylvania would be defeated, which would have caused a 50-50 tie in the Senate when combined with the correct predictions of Democratic gains in Illinois and New Hampshire. Crystal Ball overestimated the number of the Democratic gains in the house, as they picked up 6 seats instead of 13. Additionally, they failed to predict Republicans retaining the governorship of Indiana and picking up the governorship of New Hampshire. They summarized by saying "...we were wrong. The Crystal Ball is shattered."

2018
The Crystal Ball's success rate was much higher in the 2018 midterms; they correctly predicted the outcome of every U.S. Senate race, with the exception of Florida, where Democratic incumbent Bill Nelson narrowly lost to Republican Rick Scott. They slightly underestimated the number of Democratic gains in the U.S. House, as Democrats picked up a net of 40 seats, as opposed to the Crystal Ball's prediction of 34, while overestimating the number of governorships Democrats would gain, incorrectly predicting that Democrats would win Florida, Iowa and Ohio, while believing that Georgia would go to a runoff election. In fact, Republicans held all of the former three, and Republican candidate Brian Kemp narrowly won without a runoff in Georgia.

2020
In the 2020 presidential election between incumbent President Donald Trump and Democratic challenger Joe Biden, the Crystal Ball fared much better than it did in 2016, correctly predicting 49 out of 50 states and all five congressional districts awarding electoral votes in the race. Their one error was in North Carolina, where they predicted a Biden win but Trump ended up narrowly hanging on to the state. The Crystal Ball was the only pundit to correctly predict that Trump would win Florida, and one of only a few to predict Biden winning Georgia. However, their success was limited to the presidential race and the gubernatorial elections (which were all called correctly), as the Crystal Ball did not foresee Susan Collins' upset reelection win in Maine, nor did it predict that Thom Tillis would be reelected in North Carolina. Their predictions for the House elections were even more erroneous. They incorrectly predicted that Democrats Kendra Horn (OK-5), Joe Cunningham (SC-1), Abby Finkenauer (IA-1), Max Rose (NY-11), Debbie Mucarsel-Powell (FL-26), Donna Shalala (FL-27), and Ben McAdams (UT-4) would retain their seats. All of them lost reelection instead. Also, they failed to foresee Republicans holding several competitive districts.

2022
In the 2022 midterm elections, the Crystal Ball predicted that the Republican Party would gain 1 Senate seat, 24 House seats, and 1 governorship. Instead, the party lost 1 Senate seat, 2 governorships, and  gained 9 House seats. Like other pundits during the cycle, they overestimated Republican gains in most competitive races, a contrast from previous election cycles, where they largely overestimated Democrats. While Republicans did gain control of the House of Representatives, the Crystal Ball underestimated how candidate quality and polarization would undermine a potential "red wave" election. In the Senate, they were correct in predicting that Democratic incumbents in Nevada, Arizona, and New Hampshire would win re-election, and that Georgia would go to a runoff, while they were incorrect in predicting that Republican Mehmet Oz would defeat Democrat John Fetterman for an open seat. They also predicted that Republicans would win governors' races in Wisconsin, Kansas, and Arizona, all of which went to Democrats.

References

External links
Larry Sabato's Crystal Ball

2002 establishments in Virginia
American political websites
Elections in the United States
Legislative branch of the United States government
Magazines established in 2002
Magazines published in Virginia
Online magazines published in the United States
Political magazines published in the United States
University of Virginia
Weekly magazines published in the United States